Thapelo Phora (born 21 November 1991) is a South African sprinter. He competed in the 4 × 400 metres relay at the 2016 IAAF World Indoor Championships. In 2019, he won the silver medal in the men's 4 × 400 metres relay at the 2019 African Games held in Rabat, Morocco. He also won the silver medal in the men's 400 metres.

He competed in the men's 400 metres and the men's 4 x 400 metres relay at the 2020 Summer Olympics.

References

External links
 

1991 births
Living people
South African male sprinters
Place of birth missing (living people)
Athletes (track and field) at the 2019 African Games
African Games medalists in athletics (track and field)
African Games silver medalists for South Africa
Athletes (track and field) at the 2020 Summer Olympics
Olympic athletes of South Africa